Romania competed at the 2022 Winter Olympics in Beijing, China, from 4 to 20 February 2022.

On January 20, 2022, luger Raluca Strămăturaru and cross-country skier Paul Pepene were named as the flagbearers for the team during the opening ceremony. Meanwhile bobsledder Andreea Grecu was the flagbearer during the closing ceremony.

Competitors
The following is the list of number of competitors participating at the Games per sport/discipline.

Alpine skiing

By meeting the basic qualification standards, Romania has qualified one male and one female alpine skier.

Biathlon

Bobsleigh

Cross-country skiing

Romania qualified two male and one female cross-country skier.

Distance

Sprint

Luge

Mixed

Ski jumping

Speed skating

Individual

References

Nations at the 2022 Winter Olympics
2022
Winter Olympics